Ann Shoket is an American magazine writer and editor. She is the author of The Big Life and the former editor-in-chief of Seventeen magazine.

Education
Shoket received her BA from New York University.

Career
She is the author of The Big Life: Embrace the Mess, Work Your Side Hustle, Find a Monumental Relationship, and Become the Badass Babe You Were Meant to Be. She was editor-in-chief of Seventeen from 2007-2014. She began her career as a reporter at Steven Brill's The American Lawyer, then created the webzine Tag, an online community of artists and writers.  Shoket was also senior editor with the Parade family of publications, and executive editor of CosmoGIRL! magazine. While at CosmoGIRL! she created a "CosmoGIRL! Born to Lead" patch program with The Girl Scouts and she developed a national leadership campaign with The White House Project with the goal of putting a reader in the White House by the year 2024.

She has also appeared in several episodes of the reality show series America's Next Top Model as a judge.

References

External links
 Ann Shoket's official website
 Biography at Magazine Publishers of America website
 Ann Shoket at IMDB
 Biography in Russian

1972 births
Living people
American magazine editors
Women magazine editors
New York University alumni
People from Bucks County, Pennsylvania
Journalists from New York City
Journalists from Pennsylvania